Robert E. Clegg Jr. (born April 27, 1954) is a former Republican state senator from New Hampshire's 14th district, and ran unsuccessfully for Congress in New Hampshire's 2nd congressional district.

State legislator
Clegg was a member of the New Hampshire House of Representatives, where he served for four terms. He served in several leadership positions including Speaker Pro Tempore, Assistant Majority Leader and Majority Caucus Whip. He has been named Legislator of the Year by the National Republican Legislators Association, and by the Home Builders & Remodelers Association of New Hampshire. He is a past recipient of the Outstanding Legislator Award presented by Grange #327, the New Hampshire Fire Standards and Training Commission's Fire Academy Award, and the New Hampshire Health Care Association's Government Leadership Award.

The senator was a member of the Judiciary Committee, the Transportation and Interstate Cooperation Committee, and the Capital Budget Committee. He also was a member of the Capital Budget Overview Committee, Strategic Capital Plan Committee, Emergency Management System Joint Legislative Oversight Committee, Hazardous Material Transportation Advisory Board and the Telecommunications Oversight Committee. He also served as the Senate Majority Leader.

Clegg has been active in the local community, contributing his time and talents to various organizations and causes. He has served in many civic capacities in his hometown of Hudson, including as a town councilor, selectman, member of the Budget Committee, Building Board of Appeals, Economic Development Committee, and Charter Study Committee. He has been active in the Hudson Chamber of Commerce and was recognized as its Citizen of the Year. He also has been recognized by Hudson Post #48 for his work on behalf of veterans.  He is a justice of the peace.

Clegg is a member of the United States Police Canine Association (USPCA) and a board member of the USPCA Foundation. He is past President of the Hudson Taxpayers Association, Chairman of the State Building Code Review Board and a member of the Hudson Masons.

2008 election
In 2008, Clegg gave up his Senate seat to run for the U.S. House of Representatives in New Hampshire's 2nd congressional district, but lost the Republican primary to talk radio host Jennifer Horn who in turn lost to incumbent Paul Hodes.

2010 election
In 2010, Clegg joined with Republican U.S. Senate candidate Bill Binnie to take on GOP front-runner Kelly Ayotte in a TV attack ad.

Lobbying 
Bob Clegg is a lobbyist for Legislative Solutions in Concord, NH.

Personal life
He and his wife, Priscilla, reside in Hudson, New Hampshire and have two children.

Notes

External links
Bob Clegg for Congress official congressional campaign website
The New Hampshire Senate - Senator Robert E. Clegg Jr. official government website
Project Vote Smart - Senator Robert E. 'Bob' Clegg Jr. (NH) profile
Follow the Money - Robert (Bob) Clegg
2006 2004 2002 2000 1998 campaign contributions

Republican Party New Hampshire state senators
Republican Party members of the New Hampshire House of Representatives
1954 births
Living people
People from Hudson, New Hampshire